Ludovic Leroy (born September 20, 1975 in Le Quesnoy) is a French professional footballer. He currently plays in the Championnat de France amateur for SO Romorantin.

Leroy played at the professional level in Ligue 2 for Valenciennes FC, FC Martigues, Amiens SC and Stade Reims.

1975 births
Living people
French footballers
Ligue 2 players
Valenciennes FC players
FC Martigues players
Amiens SC players
Stade de Reims players
ÉFC Fréjus Saint-Raphaël players
Gap HAFC players
SO Romorantin players
Association football defenders
People from Le Quesnoy
Footballers from Hauts-de-France
Sportspeople from Nord (French department)